Asier Peña Iturria (born 15 April 1977) is a Spanish long track speed skater who participates in international competitions.

Personal records

These personal records are fast enough to be in the top-500 of the Adelskalender. Iturria has a Samalog score of 164,668 pts. This means that he is the number 829 of the world (at 12 December 2009).

Career highlights

European Allround Championships
2010 - Hamar, 29th
2009 - Heerenveen, 26th
2008 - Kolomna, 32nd

External links
Iturria at Jakub Majerski's Speedskating Database
Iturria at SkateResults.com

1977 births
Spanish male speed skaters
Living people